The 2017 AFC Cup qualifying round was played from 19 to 25 August 2016. A total of nine teams competed in the qualifying round to decide three places in the qualifying play-offs of the 2017 AFC Cup.

Teams

The following nine teams from nine associations entered the qualifying round. Teams were not split into zones for the qualifying round.

In the following table, the number of appearances and last appearance count all those since the 2004 season (including both competition proper and qualifying rounds).

Rovers were the first team from Guam to play in an AFC club competition.

Draw

The draw for the qualifying round was held on 17 June 2016, 11:00 MYT (UTC+8), at the AFC House in Kuala Lumpur, Malaysia. The nine teams were drawn into three groups of three.

For the draw, the pre-selected hosts were placed in their own pot, while the remaining teams were seeded according to the performance of their association in the 2016 AFC Cup qualifying round, with associations participating ranked and associations not participating unranked.

Format

In the qualifying round, each group was played on a single round-robin basis at the pre-selected hosts. The winners of each group advanced to the qualifying play-offs.

Tiebreakers
The teams are ranked according to points (3 points for a win, 1 point for a draw, 0 points for a loss). If tied on points, tiebreakers are applied in the following order (Regulations Article 10.4):
Points in head-to-head matches among tied teams;
Goal difference in head-to-head matches among tied teams;
Goals scored in head-to-head matches among tied teams;
Goal difference in all group matches;
Goals scored in all group matches;
Penalty shoot-out if only two teams are tied and they met in the last round of the group;
Disciplinary points (yellow card = 1 point, red card as a result of two yellow cards = 3 points, direct red card = 3 points, yellow card followed by direct red card = 4 points);
Drawing of lots.

Schedule
The schedule of each matchday was as follows.

Host Countries

Groups

Group A
All matches were held in Kyrgyzstan.
Times listed were UTC+6.

Group B
All matches were held in Mongolia.
Times listed were UTC+9.

Group C
All matches were held in Bhutan.
Times listed were UTC+6.

References

External links
, the-AFC.com
AFC Cup 2017, stats.the-AFC.com

0
AFC Cup qualifying round
AFC Cup qualifying round